Pre-war or prewar is the period before the most recent or significant war in a culture's history, and may refer to:

 Prior to World War I
 Between World War I and World War II
 Pre-war architecture, buildings from the 20th century before World War II

See also 
 Antebellum (disambiguation)